Herburt is a Polish coat of arms. It was used by several distinct and unrelated szlachta families such as the Pawcz family of Ruthenian Galicia. A coat of arms is an individual or family heirloom the origins of which lie in the 12th century.

History

Blazon

Notable bearers
Notable bearers of this coat of arms include:

 Jan Herburt (Arłamowski)
 Fryderyk Herburt
 Jan Paweł Woronicz
 Jan Szczęsny Herburt
 Mikołaj Herburt
 Mikołaj Herburt Odnowski
 Piotr Herburt
 Stanisław Herburt
 Szymon Konarski ps. Janusz Hejbowicz

Gallery

See also
 Polish heraldry
 Heraldic family
 List of Polish nobility coats of arms

Bibliography
 Tadeusz Gajl: Herbarz polski od średniowiecza do XX wieku : ponad 4500 herbów szlacheckich 37 tysięcy nazwisk 55 tysięcy rodów. L&L, 2007. .

References

Herburt